Baturin or Baturyn  may refer to:

 Baturyn (Батурин), a historic town in northern Ukraine
Sack of Baturyn in 1708
 Baturyn, Edmonton, a residential neighbourhood in Alberta, Canada
Baturin (surname)